Norborne Berkeley (May 13, 1891 – May 26, 1964) was a vice president and director of Bethlehem Steel.

Biography
A native of Danville, Virginia, he was born to Landon C. Berkeley and Anne Poe Harrison. Berkeley attended the University of Virginia, where he was a prominent athlete. He was the quarterback on the football team and shortstop on the baseball team. He served during World War I.

References

External links

1891 births
1964 deaths
Sportspeople from Danville, Virginia
Virginia Cavaliers football players
Virginia Cavaliers baseball players
American football quarterbacks
Baseball shortstops
Bethlehem Steel people